Mary Barber may refer to:

 Mary Barber (poet) (c. 1685 – c. 1755), Irish poet
 Mary Elizabeth Barber (1818–1899), British-born naturalist
 Mary Barber (bacteriologist) (1911–1965), British pathologist and bacteriologist
 Mary Augustine Barber (1789–1860), American educator and Visitation sister